Moray may refer to:

Places in Scotland
 Moray Firth, a roughly triangular inlet of the North Sea
 Moray, one of the 32 current council areas of Scotland
 Moray (Scottish Parliament constituency), a constituency of the Scottish Parliament
 Moray (UK Parliament constituency), a constituency of the UK Parliament
 County of Moray, a registration county of Scotland

History of Moray
 Mormaer of Moray, a former lordship of High Medieval Scotland destroyed in 1130
 Earl of Moray

Other uses
 Moray (name)
 Moray eel, a family of large eels found throughout the world's oceans
 Moray (Inca ruin), a town in Peru noted for a large complex of unusual Inca ruins (also named Muray in Quechua)
 USS Moray (SS-300), a United States Navy submarine
 Moray, Kansas, a community in the United States
 Moray Marathon, Scotland's longest running marathon
 Moray House School of Education, a school within the University of Edinburgh
 Moray Place, a major street in Dunedin, New Zealand
 Moray, an interactive 3-D modeling companion program to POV-Ray computer graphics software

See also 

 Moiré